Santa Maria da Feira, Travanca, Sanfins e Espargo is a civil parish in the municipality of Santa Maria da Feira, Portugal. It was formed in 2013 by the merger of the former parishes Feira, Travanca, Sanfins and Espargo. The population in 2011 was 18,194, in an area of 23.36 km2.

References

Freguesias of Santa Maria da Feira